Apollonia 6 was a 1980s American female singing trio.

Origin
Apollonia 6 was created by recording artist Prince, who had also created the group Vanity 6 one year prior in 1982, but the groups did not exist simultaneously. After a number of disputes with Prince, Vanity (Denise Matthews), the lead singer of Vanity 6, left the group in 1983 to pursue solo endeavors, recording with Motown Records and acting in films. She left behind the co-starring role that she was supposed to play in the 1984 film Purple Rain starring Prince.

Searching for a replacement, the film's director, Albert Magnoli, met aspiring actress and model Patricia Apollonia Kotero. Prince wanted her to use her middle name and Apollonia stepped into the role in the film Purple Rain, also becoming lead vocalist in the group Vanity left, Vanity 6. The other two members of Vanity 6, Brenda Bennett and Susan Moonsie, remained in the group and were joined by Apollonia, and the group was renamed Apollonia 6, proceeding to release one self-titled album, which featured Prince associates Jill Jones and Wendy & Lisa on backing vocals. The number 6 in both group names, Apollonia 6 and Vanity 6, had no meaning whatsoever to the group members, as Prince simply thought it had a nice sound to it.

A four-track video was filmed, based on the Apollonia 6 album, directed by Brian Thomson (Australian production designer of the original stage versions of The Rocky Horror Show and Jesus Christ Superstar), scripted by Keith Williams (concept writer for music videos by Phil Collins, Ray Parker Jr., and Donna Summer), with a cast consisting of Ricky Nelson, Edy Williams and Buck Henry. Shot in a Los Angeles film studio in 1985, and produced by British video firm Limelight, the video never went beyond rough cut. Footage from the project has appeared on many social networking sites, such as YouTube.

Dissolution

Prince had originally intended his classic tracks "Manic Monday" (later recorded by The Bangles), "17 Days" (later used as the B-side to "When Doves Cry"), "Take Me with U" (released on the Purple Rain soundtrack) and "The Glamorous Life" (recorded by Sheila E. in 1984) for the Apollonia 6 album. Apollonia 6 were slated to open the Purple Rain tour with Prince and Sheila E., but that idea was scrapped after the group returned from a promotional tour of Europe. However, Apollonia 6 did appear on a few select dates of the Purple Rain tour, usually during the "Baby I'm a Star" encore. One such moment is documented in the "I Would Die 4 U" and "Baby I'm a Star" performance on the VHS of Prince and the Revolution: Live, filmed in Syracuse, March 30, 1985.

After the group's demise, Kotero continued working on TV shows such as Falcon Crest and in films for the next decade. She released a solo album in 1988 entitled Apollonia.

Discography

Studio albums
 Apollonia 6 (1984)

Singles

References

 
American dance girl groups
American dance music groups
Feminist musicians
American musical trios
Musical groups from the Twin Cities
Musical groups established in 1983
Musical groups disestablished in 1985
1983 establishments in Minnesota
1985 disestablishments in Minnesota
Vocal trios
Warner Records artists